The Last Manhunt is an American Western film, released in 2022. In May 2022, it opened the Pioneertown International Film Festival. It stars Martin Sensmeier as Willie.

Worldwide rights to the film were picked up by Saban Films in June 2022. Other films have told the Paiute legend, including Tell Them Willie Boy is Here, starring Robert Redford.

Plot
The film follows a Paiute man named Willie, who treks across the desert after the accidental death of Carlota's father. Blame is placed on the young couple and they are pursued by a group of indigenous people looking for justice.

Production
It is produced by Jason Mamoa and directed by Christian Camargo.

References

External links
 

2022 films
2022 Western (genre) films
2020s American films
2020s English-language films